Highway 363 is a highway in the Canadian province of Saskatchewan. It runs from Highway 4 to Highway 2 in Moose Jaw.

Highway 363 passes near the communities of Rosenhof, Neidpath, Hallonquist, Hodgeville, Kelstern, Shamrock, Trewdale, Coderre, Courval, Old Wives, Old Wives Lake, Abound, and Valley Ridge.

Manitoba Street Expressway
Highway 363 travels down Manitoba Street and the Manitoba Street Expressway, an arterial road in Moose Jaw. Highway 363 ends at Main Street (Highway 2) in downtown Moose Jaw, but Manitoba Street continues east to connect with Highway 1 (Trans-Canada Highway) on the eastern edge of the city.

Major intersections
From west to east:

References

363